Zyudev Island is an island in the Caspian Sea. It is located off the mouths of the Volga.

Administratively, the island belongs to the Astrakhan Oblast of the Russian Federation.

References

Location

Islands of Astrakhan Oblast
Islands of the Caspian Sea